Octave Adolphe Coisy (19 February 1880 – 18 August 1947) was a French cyclist. He competed in the sprint and the points race at the 1900 Summer Olympics.

References

External links
 

1880 births
1947 deaths
People from Saint-Ouen-sur-Seine
French male cyclists
Olympic cyclists of France
Cyclists at the 1900 Summer Olympics
Sportspeople from Seine-Saint-Denis